Egils Helmanis (born 30 December 1971) is a Latvian politician and close combat instructor. , he is the deputy Chairman of the Council of Ogre Municipality in economics, sports and tourism issues.

Political activities
Egils Helmanis is an active supporter of new mothers. He also supports tourism and sport activities in region.

On 21 August 2019, the Corruption Prevention and Combating Bureau detained Helmanis over suspected misappropriation of municipal funds, but the criminal process was later termined due to lack of evidence.

References

1971 births
Living people